The Kep Track is a bicycle, walking and horse track in the Darling Range and further east in Western Australia.

It is based on the route of the former Western Australian Government Railways Eastern Railway from Mundaring to Clackline, then following the Goldfields Water Supply Scheme pipeline route through to Northam.

The promotion and planning of the track is linked in with the Golden Pipeline Project of the National Trust of Western Australia.

See also
 Eastern Railway (Western Australia)
 Railway Reserves Heritage Trail
 List of rail trails
 Bibbulmun Track
 Munda Biddi Trail

References

Bibliography

External links
Kep Track Home Page
Kep Ultra Marathon Website

Cycling in Perth, Western Australia
Rail trails in Australia
Hiking and bushwalking tracks in Western Australia
Mundaring Weir
Northam, Western Australia
